Stephen Anderson, better known as Bud'da, is an American producer, songwriter, composer and rapper for artists such as Ice Cube, Dr. Dre, Xzibit and Aaliyah. Through the successful Westside Connection stint, and the mutual acquaintance of fellow Pittsburgh producer Sam Sneed, Dr. Dre wanted to feature snippets of a Bud’da-produced track in the beginning and end of the 2pac & Dr. Dre video for “California Love,” off Tupac Shakur’s All Eyez on Me. Soon after Dr. Dre’s historic departure from Death Row Records, Bud’da was once again recruited by Dr. Dre to co-produce the lead single "Been There, Done That" off the Dr. Dre Presents the Aftermath album.

Early life 
Bud'da was born and raised in Pittsburgh, Pennsylvania, and began his career with production for Da Lench Mob Records' group Kausion. He went on to work with a wide range of artists including Xzibit, Nas, Timbaland, Shanice, Lenny Kravitz, Tank, Dawn Robinson of En Vogue, King T, Dr. Dre, Aaliyah, and Ice Cube. It was with Ice Cube that Bud'da came into more prominence. Producing five tracks on the Ice Cube-led Westside Connection album “Bow Down”, along with WC and Mack 10, including the title track “Bow Down”.

Career 
Bud'da started briefly with Death Row Records, then in 1996 he joined Aftermath records to work with Dr. Dre and others.  Bud'da met Dre while playing different beats including "California Love".  As Bud'da mentioned in a HipHopDX interview, "that was my introduction into working with him. A couple of months started passing, and once he was gonna make that transition [away from Death Row Records] he asked if I wanted to be down with the transition." His musical style was influenced by "California Love", "Been There, Done That", and the East Coast–West Coast rivalry. Eventually, Dr. Dre signed Bud'da as a producer and as an artist. Dr Dre Presents...The Aftermath was released on November 26, 1996. In spite of Dr. Dre's name being on the album, and it being certified platinum, it received mixed reviews and was not amongst the year's more commercially successful releases.

At the end of his tenure with Aftermath, Bud'da reminisced about Dre: "I learned everything that I know from him. I think that those years that I was at Aftermath if anything, to me, I consider it like I went to college. ‘Cause the knowledge I got during that time, it’s priceless."

Aaliyah 
Bud’da was introduced into Blackground Records in 1999, which acquired artists such as Aaliyah, Tank, Static Major, and Timbaland. One of the first projects Bud’da worked on was Aaliyah’s third and final studio album: Aaliyah. The approach of the project was to expand the boundaries of R and B. Aaliyah was wanted to go in a new direction, and Bud’da provided that new sound. As project was breaking new ground Bud’da said in an interview“But if you create your own sound, your own path then you’re going to be a trendsetter and people are going to do what you want to do and then you’re going to be able to change and make some kind of a movement versus just doing something that everybody else is doing. Aaliyah didn’t want to do that and nobody involved with the project wanted to do that.”With the darkness of Rock, the undertones of UK Garage, hard hitting drums of Hip-hop, and the live percussions of latin music, Bud’da mark on the “Aaliyah” project where felt. On songs such as “Never No More” and “I Can Be” was his presence was felt most along with Static Major and Tank as well as other songs (See Discography). Aaliyah was released in July 2001. In the United States, it debuted at number two on the Billboard 200 albums chart, selling 187,000 copies in the week of August 4. She eventually sold 2,600,000 million albums and 13 million world wide. Additionally, Aaliyah was met with highly positive reviews from most critics. Unfortunately, On August 25, 2001, Aaliyah and the members of the record company, died in a plane crash after “filming rock the boat” music video.

Discography

Production

Remixes
"Georgy Porgy (The Bud'da Sauce Remix)" on the single "Georgy Porgy" (1999) by Eric Benét
"How Long" on the album Dawn(2002) by Dawn Robinson
"Got To Give It Up (Remix)" on the album I Care 4 U (2002) by Aaliyah
"Those Were The Days (Bud'da Remix)" (2001) by Aaliyah - unreleased

Film and television composing

References

External links
 Exclusive Interview at DubCNN 2011
 2011 Interview at HipHopDX 
 2011 nterview Pt. 2 at HipHopDX 
 
 Bud'da Music Online
 YouTube Channel for Bud'da

Living people
American hip hop record producers
Musicians from Pittsburgh
Musicians from Los Angeles
Record producers from Pennsylvania
Record producers from California
1972 births